The Sham Chun River, Shum Chum River, or Shenzhen River serves as the natural border between Hong Kong and Mainland China, together with the Sha Tau Kok River, Mirs Bay and Deep Bay.

It formed part of the limit of the lease of the New Territories in 1898 in the Convention for the Extension of Hong Kong Territory (known also as the Second Convention of Peking).

It separates Yuen Long District, North District of Hong Kong, and the city of Shenzhen, Guangdong. Its source is at Wutong Mountain, Shenzhen. Its tributaries includes Ping Yuen River, Shek Sheung River, Sheung Yue River, Ng Tung River, Buji River and Tan Shan River. The Shenzhen Reservoir also flows into the river when it is full.

The river flows into Deep Bay (also known as Hau Hoi Wan and Shenzhen Bay). The Mai Po Marshes is at its estuary.

Efforts have been made to alleviate flooding and pollution problems through river draining, which produced the Lok Ma Chau Loop.

River crossings
 "International Bridge" near Lin Ma Hang–Changling
 Heung Yuen Wai Control Point–Liantang Port
 Cement factory near Nga Yiu
 Bridge near Kaw Liu–Luofang
 Man Kam To Control Point–Wenjindu Port
 Lo Wu Control Point–Luohu Port
 Lo Wu Bridge (railway bridge)
 Lok Ma Chau Control Point–Huanggang Port
 Lok Ma Chau Spur Line Control Point–Futian Port
 XRL Hong Kong Section–Mainland Section within Shenzhen (tunnel across Sham Chun River)

See also
 Frontier Closed Area – the closed border zone on the Hong Kong side of the river
 List of rivers and nullahs in Hong Kong

External links

 Rivers of Hong Kong, in Chinese

Rivers of Hong Kong
Rivers of Shenzhen
North District, Hong Kong
Borders of Hong Kong
Border rivers
Geography of Shenzhen